Gwisdek is a surname. Notable people with the surname include: 

Michael Gwisdek (1942–2020), German actor and film director
Robert Gwisdek (born 1984), German actor and musician

Surnames of German origin